Calhoun Falls Charter School (CFCS) is a public 6–12 school located in Calhoun Falls, South Carolina, United States. It was founded in 2008. It is a combined middle and high school. CFCS was awarded a charter in 2008 and opened its doors in August of that year. The school is autonomous, but operated under the South Carolina Public Charter School District until 2018. Since August of 2018 CFCS is under the sponsorship of the Charter Institute at Erskine.

Origin
After a vote by the Abbeville County school board, Calhoun Falls High School was closed in December of 2007. The people of the town of Calhoun Falls reacted by forming a charter school. Calhoun Falls Charter School on the same campus as the former Calhoun Falls High School.

Academics
The school graduated its first class in June 2009, with 32 graduating seniors. CFCS offers courses at the college prep and honors levels, as well as college dual-enrollment courses through an agreement with Piedmont Technical College.

Athletics
CFSC's athletic teams are known as the Blue Flashes.

Calhoun Falls Charter School Booster Club is a not-for-profit 503(C) organization that raises funds for the sole purpose of funding organized sports within the school.  No public tax dollars are used to fund these programs.

State championships 
 Baseball: 1951
 Basketball - Boys: 1940, 1952
 Softball: 1988, 1989

References

Schools in Abbeville County, South Carolina
Charter schools in South Carolina
Educational institutions established in 2008
Public high schools in South Carolina
Public middle schools in South Carolina
2008 establishments in South Carolina